Last Chance for a Thousand Years: Dwight Yoakam's Greatest Hits from the  is the second greatest hits compilation album released by American country music singer Dwight Yoakam. It includes 11 of his hit singles from the 1990s, as well as three new recordings. These new songs are a cover of Queen's "Crazy Little Thing Called Love", as well as an adapted rendition of Rodney Crowell's "Thinking About Leaving" and "I'll Go Back to Her", originally by Waylon Jennings. “Crazy Little Thing Called Love,” which hit #12 on the country singles chart and rose to #64 on Billboard’s Hot 100, was Yoakam's biggest hit single since 1993's "Fast as You."  Last Chance for a Thousand Years has been certified gold by the RIAA.

Track listing

Personnel

 Beth Anderson – background vocals 
 Maxi Anderson – background vocals
 Pete Anderson – electric guitar, acoustic guitar, hand claps
 Tom Brumley – steel guitar, lap steel guitar
 Lenny Castro – percussion
 Jim Christie – drums
 Jonathan Clark – background vocals
 Chuck Domanico – upright bass
 Jeff Donavan – drums
 Skip Edwards – accordion, keyboards, organ, piano
 Tommy Funderburk – background vocals
 Jim Haas – background vocals
 Scott Humphrey – drum programming 
 Carl Jackson – background vocals
 Scott Joss – fiddle, mandolin
 Jim Lauderdale – background vocals
 Roger Miller – background vocals
 Gary Morse – steel guitar
 Tim O'Brien – mandolin, background vocals 
 Dean Parks – acoustic guitar
 Taras Prodaniuk – six-string bass guitar, bass guitar
 Amy Ray – background vocals
 Don Reed – fiddle
 Emily Saliers – background vocals
 Greg Smith – baritone saxophone
 Lee Thornburg – trombone, trumpet
 Carmen Twilley – background vocals 
 Dusty Wakeman – six-string bass guitar, hand claps
 Gary White – hand claps
 Dwight Yoakam – acoustic guitar, electric guitar, hand claps, lead vocals, background vocals

Track information and credits verified from the album's liner notes.

Chart performance

Weekly charts

Year-end charts

Singles

Certifications

References

1999 greatest hits albums
Dwight Yoakam albums
Albums produced by Pete Anderson
Reprise Records compilation albums